Charlie Peter John Burns (born 27 May 1995) is an English footballer who plays as a goalkeeper who plays for Beaconsfield Town.

Career

Milton Keynes Dons
Born in Croydon, Burns joined the youth system of Milton Keynes Dons as a sixteen-year-old in 2011 on a two-year scholarship. After completing his scholarship in the summer of 2013, Burns was told that he was free to find another club. However, the club then went on to reverse their decision and allowed Burns to complete a third year as a scholar.

2013–14
In May 2014, he made his professional debut for the club in a 3–1 defeat to Leyton Orient, replacing David Martin as a substitute. Burns then went on to sign his first professional contract on a one-year deal, with the option of a further year.

2014–15
In September 2014, Burns moved to Cambridge City on a month's loan as cover for the injured Zac Barrett and Richard Knight.

Burns then moved on loan to Truro City on an initial month's loan. which was then extended to the end of the season. He was recalled in February 2015 following injury to Milton Keynes Dons first choice David Martin.

2015–16
On 15 January 2016, Burns joined Southern Premier League side Hayes & Yeading United on an initial one-month loan. He went on to make five appearances for the club before being recalled to his parent club.

With injuries and suspensions affecting Milton Keynes Dons goalkeepers David Martin and Cody Cropper respectively, Burns featured for the first team in four Championship fixtures. On 19 April 2016, Burns achieved his first clean sheet for the club in a 0–0 draw with Sheffield Wednesday.

2016–17
On 2 May 2017, following a season without making an appearance for the club, Milton Keynes Dons announced that Burns had been released along with several other players.

Galway United
On 26 July 2017, Burns signed for League of Ireland Premier Division side Galway United until the end of the 2017 season.

Grays Athletic
Burns signed for Isthmian League North Division club Grays Athletic in January 2018.

Hampton & Richmond Borough
In July 2018, Burns signed for National League South club Hampton & Richmond Borough. On 16 August 2018 he was sent out on a one-month loan to Southern Football League Premier South club Kings Langley.

Hayes & Yeading United
Burns joined Hayes & Yeading United in January 2019.

Beaconsfield Town
I March 2019, Burns joined Beaconsfield Town.

Career statistics

References

External links
Charlie Burns profile at Hampton & Richmond Borough

Charlie Burns at Aylesbury United

1995 births
Living people
English footballers
Footballers from Croydon
Association football goalkeepers
Milton Keynes Dons F.C. players
Cambridge City F.C. players
Truro City F.C. players
Hayes & Yeading United F.C. players
Galway United F.C. players
Grays Athletic F.C. players
Hampton & Richmond Borough F.C. players
Kings Langley F.C. players
Metropolitan Police F.C. players
English Football League players
Southern Football League players
Isthmian League players